The Yeywa Hydropower Station, located on the Myitnge River,  southeast of Mandalay city, at Yeywa village in Kyaukse Township, Mandalay Region in central Myanmar, is the country's first roller-compacted concrete (RCC) dam, and the site of a  hydroelectric power plant, the largest in the country.

Background
The plant feasibility study was done in 1999. In May 2001, agreement of consulting service between MEPE and COLENCO Power Engineering, Ltd. had signed. In 2003 agreement part 2 for Detail Design, preparation of tender documents and guidance services for construction supervision was signed. The river diversion was completed on December 12, 2004 and RCC placement began on February 8, 2006. The Burmese government announced plans for the Yeywa Dam in late 2001. In 2004, Burma's Ministry of Electric Power (MEPE) signed a Memorandum of understanding with a consortium of Chinese companies created by China International Trust & Investment Co. (CITIC) and Sinohydro Corporation for implementation of the project. On September 2, 2005, a ceremony to mark the signing of contract between the Hydroelectric Power Department under the Ministry of Electric Power and the China National Heavy Machinery Corporation (CHMC) for the Yeywa Hydroelectric Power Project was held in Yangon [Rangoon],  Site work began in 2004 and all four generators were commissioned in 2010. The project was completed in November 2011.

Design

There is a 790 MW (4 × 197.5 MW) powerhouse at the toe of the dam on the south bank of the river. The power house and dam structures are designed to withstand earthquakes of up to eight on the Richter scale.

Four water intake towers were built as conventional reinforced concrete structures abutting the upstream (east) face of the RCC dam. This enabled the contractor to build the towers above the penstock inlets before the start of RCC construction in order to minimise interference with the RCC construction activity.

This outlet tunnel enables reservoir drawdown and control during reservoir filling, maintenance of downstream riparian river flow during the impounding period and, together with the spillway, serves to redirect flood waters of the Myitnge river and maintain river flow during an emergency when all turbines are closed down.

The Bellin and the Meiktila Sub-Power Stations will be linked to each other with 100 km long 23 kV double power lines. US$45.8 million worth of 230 KVA cables and equipment were used for construction and linking of these sub- power stations.

Construction
Several construction companies from China, Switzerland, and Britain and Myanmar have been involved in various stages of the Yeywa Dam, including the Chinese companies: Export-Import Bank of China (China Exim Bank), China Gezhouba Group Co. (CGGC), China National Electric Equipment Co., Hunan Savoo Overseas Water & Electric Engineering Co. and China National Heavy Machinery Co. The Swiss company Colenco Power Engineering, the Germany-based company Voith Siemens, and the British Malcolm Dunstan & Associates.

A key aspect in the successful construction of the Yeywa RCC dam was comprehensive training of the local staff during preparative for and initial stages of the construction. High-Tech Concrete Technologies (HTCT), a member of Shwe Taung Group, was the one who has been succeeding the knowledge from local perspective. Up to 5,000 workers were employed on this large construction project. Equipment selected for the concreting operations include Putzmeister's MX 32 stationary boom, an M 38 truck-mounted concrete pump and two BSA 2,109 HP stationary pumps.

A bridge was built across the river, just downstream of the dam, to replace the ferry system, which had been the only means for transport across the river.

Various studies were conducted during construction, and identified risk factors, one of them was "Key Organizational Risk Factors: A Case Study of Hydroelectric Power Projects in Myanmar".

Impact
 of electricity per year will be supplied to the Mandalay Division regional power grid for public and private consumption.

In 2005 the Myanmar Times reported that three villages near the dam had been relocated. The villagers had depended on the Myitnge River for their fishing, farming and logging livelihoods, the sources of which will be flooded by the dam. Ancient cultural sites like the Sappa Sukha Htattaw Temple will also be flooded and forever lost.

See also

Dams in Burma
 List of power stations in Burma

References

External sources

Dams completed in 2010
Energy infrastructure completed in 2011
Dams in Myanmar
Hydroelectric power stations in Myanmar
Buildings and structures in Mandalay Region
Roller-compacted concrete dams
Gravity dams
2011 establishments in Myanmar